The Winter War was the 1939-1940 war between Finland and the Soviet Union.

Winter War may also refer to:

 The Winter War (film), a 1989 Finnish film about the Winter War
 Fire and Ice: The Winter War of Finland and Russia, a 2006 documentary film
Cold-weather warfare, military operations affected by snow, ice, thawing conditions or cold, both on land and at sea.

See also
 The Huntsman: Winter's War
 Talvisota (disambiguation)
 Winter warfare